Polystachya maculata is a species of orchid endemic to Burundi.

maculata
Endemic flora of Burundi